MurmurHash is a non-cryptographic hash function suitable for general hash-based lookup.
It was created by Austin Appleby in 2008 and is currently hosted on GitHub along with its test suite named 'SMHasher'. It also exists in a number of variants, all of which have been released into the public domain. The name comes from two basic operations, multiply (MU) and rotate (R), used in its inner loop.

Unlike cryptographic hash functions, it is not specifically designed to be difficult to reverse by an adversary, making it unsuitable for cryptographic purposes.

Variants

MurmurHash3
The current version is MurmurHash3, which yields a 32-bit or 128-bit hash value.  When using 128-bits, the x86 and x64 versions do not produce the same values, as the algorithms are optimized for their respective platforms. MurmurHash3 was released alongside SMHasher—a hash function test suite.

MurmurHash2
MurmurHash2 yields a 32-bit or 64-bit value. It came in multiple variants, including some that allowed incremental hashing and aligned or neutral versions.

 MurmurHash2 (32-bit, x86) - The original version; contains a flaw that weakens collision in some cases.
 MurmurHash2A (32-bit, x86) - A fixed variant using Merkle–Damgård construction. Slightly slower.
 CMurmurHash2A (32-bit, x86) - MurmurHash2A but works incrementally.
 MurmurHashNeutral2 (32-bit, x86) - Slower, but endian and alignment neutral.
 MurmurHashAligned2 (32-bit, x86) - Slower, but does aligned reads (safer on some platforms).
 MurmurHash64A (64-bit, x64) - The original 64-bit version. Optimized for 64-bit arithmetic.
 MurmurHash64B (64-bit, x86) - A 64-bit version optimized for 32-bit platforms. It is not a true 64-bit hash due to insufficient mixing of the stripes.

The person who originally found the flaw in MurmurHash2 created an unofficial 160-bit version of MurmurHash2 called MurmurHash2_160.

MurmurHash1
The original MurmurHash was created as an attempt to make a faster function than Lookup3. Although successful, it hadn't been tested thoroughly and wasn't capable of providing 64-bit hashes as in Lookup3. It had a rather elegant design, that would be later built upon in MurmurHash2, combining a multiplicative hash (similar to Fowler–Noll–Vo hash function) with a Xorshift.

Implementations
The canonical implementation is in C++, but there are efficient ports for a variety of popular languages, including Python, C, Go, C#, D, Lua, Perl, Ruby, Rust, PHP, Common Lisp, Haskell, Elm, Clojure, Scala, Java, Erlang, Swift, Object Pascal, Kotlin, and JavaScript.

It has been adopted into a number of open-source projects, most notably libstdc++ (ver 4.6), nginx (ver 1.0.1), Rubinius, libmemcached (the C driver for Memcached), npm (nodejs package manager), maatkit, Hadoop, Kyoto Cabinet, Cassandra, Solr, vowpal wabbit, Elasticsearch, Guava, Kafka and RedHat Virtual Data Optimizer (VDO).

Vulnerabilities
Hash functions can be vulnerable to collision attacks, where a user can choose input data in such a way so as to intentionally cause hash collisions. Jean-Philippe Aumasson and Daniel J. Bernstein were able to show that even implementations of MurmurHash using a randomized seed are vulnerable to so-called HashDoS attacks. With the use of differential cryptanalysis they were able to generate inputs that would lead to a hash collision. The authors of the attack recommend to use their own SipHash instead.

Algorithm
 algorithm Murmur3_32 is
     // Note: In this version, all arithmetic is performed with unsigned 32-bit integers.
     //       In the case of overflow, the result is reduced modulo .
     input: key, len, seed
 
     c1 ← 0xcc9e2d51
     c2 ← 0x1b873593
     r1 ← 15
     r2 ← 13
     m ← 5
     n ← 0xe6546b64
 
     hash ← seed
 
     for each fourByteChunk of key do
         k ← fourByteChunk
 
         k ← k × c1
         k ← k ROL r1
         k ← k × c2
 
         hash ← hash XOR k
         hash ← hash ROL r2
         hash ← (hash × m) + n
 
     with any remainingBytesInKey do
         remainingBytes ← SwapToLittleEndian(remainingBytesInKey)
         // Note: Endian swapping is only necessary on big-endian machines.
         //       The purpose is to place the meaningful digits towards the low end of the value,
         //       so that these digits have the greatest potential to affect the low range digits
         //       in the subsequent multiplication.  Consider that locating the meaningful digits
         //       in the high range would produce a greater effect upon the high digits of the
         //       multiplication, and notably, that such high digits are likely to be discarded
         //       by the modulo arithmetic under overflow.  We don't want that.
 
         remainingBytes ← remainingBytes × c1
         remainingBytes ← remainingBytes ROL r1
         remainingBytes ← remainingBytes × c2
 
         hash ← hash XOR remainingBytes
 
     hash ← hash XOR len
 
     hash ← hash XOR (hash >> 16)
     hash ← hash × 0x85ebca6b
     hash ← hash XOR (hash >> 13)
     hash ← hash × 0xc2b2ae35
     hash ← hash XOR (hash >> 16)

A sample C implementation follows (for little-endian CPUs):

static inline uint32_t murmur_32_scramble(uint32_t k) {
    k *= 0xcc9e2d51;
    k = (k << 15) | (k >> 17);
    k *= 0x1b873593;
    return k;
}
uint32_t murmur3_32(const uint8_t* key, size_t len, uint32_t seed)
{
	uint32_t h = seed;
    uint32_t k;
    /* Read in groups of 4. */
    for (size_t i = len >> 2; i; i--) {
        // Here is a source of differing results across endiannesses.
        // A swap here has no effects on hash properties though.
        memcpy(&k, key, sizeof(uint32_t));
        key += sizeof(uint32_t);
        h ^= murmur_32_scramble(k);
        h = (h << 13) | (h >> 19);
        h = h * 5 + 0xe6546b64;
    }
    /* Read the rest. */
    k = 0;
    for (size_t i = len & 3; i; i--) {
        k <<= 8;
        k |= key[i - 1];
    }
    // A swap is *not* necessary here because the preceding loop already
    // places the low bytes in the low places according to whatever endianness
    // we use. Swaps only apply when the memory is copied in a chunk.
    h ^= murmur_32_scramble(k);
    /* Finalize. */
	h ^= len;
	h ^= h >> 16;
	h *= 0x85ebca6b;
	h ^= h >> 13;
	h *= 0xc2b2ae35;
	h ^= h >> 16;
	return h;
}

See also
 Non-cryptographic hash functions

References

External links
 Official SMHasher site

Hash function (non-cryptographic)
Articles with example pseudocode
Articles with example C code